The Swinomish Channel is an  long salt-water channel in Washington state, United States, which connects Skagit Bay to the south, and Padilla Bay to the north, separating Fidalgo Island from mainland Skagit County. The Swinomish Channel is the smallest of the three entrances to Puget Sound—the other two being Deception Pass and Admiralty Inlet.

The Swinomish Channel is partly natural and partly dredged. Before being dredged, it was a collection of shallow tidal sloughs, salt marshes, and mudflats known as Swinomish Slough. The United States Army Corps of Engineers used dredging and diking to create a navigable channel, completed in 1937 during the Great Depression.

The channel is heavily used by fishing boats, tugs, recreational craft, and shallow-draft freight vessels.

To maintain navigable depths, the Swinomish Channel must be dredged at least every three years. Dedicated federal funding for continued dredging was eliminated in the 1990s. A study in 2004–2008 determined that sedimentation would render the channel's north end impassable for virtually all vessels by 2015, and its south end by 2019. The channel was dredged again in 2008. In 2012 the Army Corps of Engineers received funding from Congress for another dredging project, which was finished in January 2013. The channel was most recently dredged in 2018.

References

Channels of the United States
Bodies of water of Skagit County, Washington
Bodies of water of Washington (state)
Washington placenames of Native American origin